Melville Dundas was a major Scottish construction company.

History
The business was established by Alexander Dundas in 1908 and incorporated as Melville Dundas & Whitson in 1932. Kenneth Dundas took over as chairman of the business in 1937. During the Second World War the company was one of the contractors engaged in building the Mulberry harbour units. The company was acquired by F J C Lilley plc in 1981 which traded as Lilley plc from April 1989 until it went into receivership in January 1993. Melville Dundas was bought out of receivership by the management but went into administration itself in May 2003.

Major projects undertaken by the company included the George V Bridge, Glasgow completed in 1928, the extension to the Glasgow Dental Hospital and School completed in 1970, University Hospital Crosshouse completed in 1978 and the conversion of Queen's Hall, Edinburgh completed in 1979.

References

Sources

British companies established in 1908
Construction and civil engineering companies of the United Kingdom
Companies based in Glasgow
1908 establishments in Scotland
British companies disestablished in 2003
2003 disestablishments in Scotland
Construction and civil engineering companies of Scotland
Construction and civil engineering companies disestablished in 2003
Construction and civil engineering companies established in 1908